Springfield Presbyterian Church is a historic church in Sharpsburg, Kentucky. It was built in 1821 and added to the National Register of Historic Places in 1979.

In 1932, an archaeological site, 15BH13, was recorded in the vicinity of the church: a local resident reported finding stone box graves in a field near the church. These are typical of some burials by ancient indigenous peoples of the region.

References

See also
National Register of Historic Places listings in Kentucky

Presbyterian churches in Kentucky
Churches on the National Register of Historic Places in Kentucky
National Register of Historic Places in Bath County, Kentucky
1821 establishments in Kentucky
Churches completed in 1821
Greek Revival church buildings in Kentucky
Archaeological sites on the National Register of Historic Places in Kentucky
Native American history of Kentucky